The women's hammer throw at the 2012 World Junior Championships in Athletics was held at the Estadi Olímpic Lluís Companys on 12 and 14 July.

Medalists

Records
, the existing world junior and championship records were as follows.

Qualification
Qual. rule: qualification standard 62.00 m (Q) or at least best 12 qualified (q)

Final

Participation
According to an unofficial count, 39 athletes from 27 countries participated in the event.

References

External links
WJC12 Hammer throw schedule

Hammer Throw
Hammer throw at the World Athletics U20 Championships
2012 in women's athletics